The Corpus Christi Basilica (Polish: Bazylika Bożego Ciała), located in the Kazimierz district of Kraków, Poland is a Gothic church founded by King Casimir III the Great in 1335.

History
The basilica was erected in stages beginning in 1340 until about the mid-15th century. It was intended as a monastery church, which explains the large plot of land on which it stands, and the presence of a monastic cemetery next to it. In 1404 King Władysław II Jagiełło gave it to the Canons Regular of the Lateran, a congregation which he had brought in from Kłodzko.

Interior
The interior of the church is a mixture of Polish Gothic and impressive Polish Baroque architecture with structural features such as a large gilded Baroque high altar, a boat-shaped pulpit (1750), and the organ. The church was robbed clean and the interior utterly devastated by soldiers of the 1655 Swedish invasion (the Deluge), which explains the prevalence of Baroque in its current decoration. The church is said to contain one of the most beautiful Baroque choir stalls in Central Europe. Bartolommeo Berrecci, the Renaissance artist who designed Sigismund's Chapel at Wawel, is buried there.

Corpus Christi Basilica houses the largest organs in Krakow. The main instrument was built between 1958 and 1963 using some elements of the old organ dating back to the 1770s. It was designed for 83 pitches and consists of two parts. The main organ placed on the choir and side organs located in the chancel. The organs have a total of 5950 pipes and 25 bells. They have the ability to play works written on an echo basis. The sound of organs 70 meters away from each other gives the listener a unique experience.

See also
Churches of Kraków

References

External links

 Kraków Tourism information about Krakow
 Protect Kraków Heritage Campaign
 Map: Kraków Heritage Under Threat
 Info about Corpus Christi Basilica in Krakow Wiki

15th-century Roman Catholic church buildings in Poland
Roman Catholic churches in Kraków
Gothic architecture in Poland